Jovan Jovanović (born 10 June 1970) is a Serbian politician and diplomat. He has served in the National Assembly of Serbia since 2016, originally with the reformist It's Enough – Restart association and later with the Civic Platform. Jovanović was previously Serbia's ambassador to Indonesia and several other countries in Southeast Asia.

Early life and career
Jovanović is a graduate of the University of Belgrade Faculty of Political Sciences and has a master's degree in Public and International Affairs from the University of Pittsburgh Graduate School of Public and International Affairs. He has been an Edward Mason Fellow and a Harvard International Student Fellow of Harvard Kennedy School, where he also received a Masters of Public Administration, and has been active in numerous media, academic, and administrative projects since 2000.

Jovanović was a foreign policy advisor in the office of Serbia's deputy prime minister between 2004 and 2006, working with ministers Miroljub Labus and Ivana Dulić-Marković. In 2010, he was a special assistant to Dino Patti Djalal, spokesperson for Indonesian president Susilo Bambang Yudhoyono. From 2012 to 2014, Jovanović served as Serbia's ambassador to Indonesia and was also a non-resident ambassador to Thailand, Cambodia, Singapore, Malaysia, the Philippines, Vietnam, Brunei, East Timor, and the Association of Southeast Asian Nations (ASEAN).

Parliamentary career
Jovanović received the seventeenth position on the It's Enough – Restart electoral list in the 2016 Serbian parliamentary election. The list won sixteen mandates, and he narrowly missed direct election. He was able to enter the assembly on August 11, 2016, following the resignation of Svetlana Kozić, an elected member further up the list. He initially served as an opposition member in the parliamentary grouping led by Saša Radulović.

In February 2017, Jovanović and two of his parliamentary colleagues left the It's Enough – Restart group and started a new organization called the Civic Platform. The new group supported Saša Janković's bid for the Serbian presidency in the 2017 presidential election. In May 2017, the three members of this group joined with two parliamentarians from the New Party to start a new parliamentary caucus known as the Independent MPs Club. At the assembly group's formation, they announced that the leadership would rotate among different members. Jovanović was the group's first leader in the assembly.

In 2019, Jovanović received a nomination for the T. Washington Fellows at University of Washington.
He is a member of Serbia's parliamentary friendship groups with Indonesia, Poland, Spain, and the United States of America.
Along with several other opposition parties, the Civic Platform boycotted the 2020 Serbian parliamentary election. In 2022, he joined the Serbia Centre organization led by Zdravko Ponoš.

References

1970 births
Living people
Politicians from Belgrade
Members of the National Assembly (Serbia)
Enough is Enough (party) politicians
Civic Platform (Serbia) politicians
University of Belgrade alumni
University of Pittsburgh alumni
Harvard Kennedy School alumni
Mason Fellows